Eupterote pandya is a moth in the family Eupterotidae. It was described by Frederic Moore in 1865. It is found in India.

Adults are greyish fawn-colour, the forewings with several transverse indistinct brown undulating lines, curving inwardly to the costa, bordered exteriorly by an oblique dark double line extending from the apex to the inner margin. The hindwings have a similar series of undulating lines and a dark-bordered double line. Both wings have a submarginal series of blackish spots.

References

Moths described in 1865
Eupterotinae